is a railway station in the town of Mori, Shizuoka Prefecture, Japan, operated by the third sector Tenryū Hamanako Railroad.

Lines
Morimachibyōin-mae Station is served by the Tenryū Hamanako Line, and is located 13.6 kilometers from the starting point of the line at Kakegawa Station.

Station layout
The station has one side platform serving a single track. The station had a shelter on the platform, but no station building. The station is unattended.

Adjacent stations

|-
!colspan=5|Tenryū Hamanako Railroad

Station History
Morimachibyōin-mae Station was established on March 14, 2015.

Passenger statistics
In fiscal 2016, the station was used by an average of 34 passengers daily (boarding passengers only).

Surrounding area
 Mori town hospital

See also
 List of Railway Stations in Japan

References

External links

  Tenryū Hamanako Railroad Station information 
 

Railway stations in Shizuoka Prefecture
Railway stations in Japan opened in 2015
Stations of Tenryū Hamanako Railroad
Mori, Shizuoka